Chisungu: A Girl’s Initiation Ceremony among the Bemba of Zambia (1956) is a book by Audrey Richards. It was reviewed in more than one scholarly journal, and is on reading lists for classes at the University of Cambridge and the University of Reading.

References

1956 non-fiction books
Books about Zambia
Social anthropology